Dortch is a surname. Notable people with the surname include:

Charles Dortch (born 1940) US born archaeologist active in Western Australia
Greg Dortch (born 1998), American football player
Isaac Foote Dortch, captain of the United States Navy
Richard Dortch, Assemblies of God District Superintendent for Illinois and an Assemblies of God Executive Presbyter
William Theophilus Dortch,  American politician from North Carolina

See also
The USS Dortch, destroyer of the United States Navy named for Isaac Foote Dortch
Dortch Enterprises, American fast food franchisee